Râșca is a commune in Cluj County, Transylvania, Romania. It is composed of five villages: Dealu Mare, Lăpuștești (Felsőszamos), Mărcești, Râșca and Stațiunea Fântânele.

References

Atlasul localităților județului Cluj (Cluj County Localities Atlas), Suncart Publishing House, Cluj-Napoca, 

Communes in Cluj County
Localities in Transylvania